Syed Ahmad Barelvi or Sayyid Ahmad (1786–1831) was an Islamic revivalist, scholar, military commander, and celebrated freebooter from Raebareli, a part of the historical United Provinces of Agra and Oudh (now called Uttar Pradesh). He is considered a scholarly authority by the Ahl-i Hadith and Deobandi movements. The epithet 'Barelvi' is derived from Raebareli, his place of origin.

His ancestors migrated to India in the early 13th century. Abul Hasan Ali Hasani Nadwi wrote Seerat-i-Sayyid Ahmad Shaheed, the first historical biography of Syed Ahmad Barelvi.

Early life and military service
Born in Raebareli in 1786, Syed Ahmad received his initial education in his hometown. At the age of 18, he traveled to Lucknow in search of a job. He then moved to Delhi, where he became a disciple of Shah Abdul Aziz, son of Shah Waliullah Dehlawi.

After his tutelage under Shah 'Abd al-Azeez from 1806 to 1811, Syed Ahmad began his career as a horse soldier in the militia of Amir Khan, a military expeditionary at the age of 25. This was an era of military campaigns in India during which Nawabs and governors established their power by occupying territories. Syed Ahmad spent seven years in the service of Amir Khan, who only fought to loot and plunder.

In 1817, after the Third Anglo-Maratha War, Amir Khan allied with the East India Company, the Governor-General and Commander-in-Chief, the Marquess of Hastings, resolved to defeat the Pindaris whom they deemed a menace. The Treaty of Gwalior severed the link between them and Scindia. Moreover, the treaty required the latter to join forces with the East India Company to eliminate the Pindaris and Pathans. Bowing to the inevitable, Amir Khan assiduously came to terms with the English, agreeing to disband his men in return for a large stipend and recognition as a hereditary ruler. Amir Khan was recognized as a hereditary Nawab, disbanded his forces, and quietly settled down to consolidate his little state. He became a faithful friend to the British, earning praise and consideration from successive pro-consuls. From Syed Ahmad's perspective, this was not just a financial problem but also a spiritual disaster, because for him the British were kuffar (Christian infidels).

Now unemployed, Syed Ahmad returned to Delhi after his service and decided to emulate Amir Khan. Journalist Tariw Hasan writes that W.W. Hunter described Syed Ahmad "as a robber who took to religion to plunder for wealth". During this period in his life, Syed Ahmad became more mature and harmonized his military experiences with a zealous commitment to establish Sharia (Islamic law). Two family members of the theologian Shah Waliullah—Shah Ismail Dehlavi (1771–1831) and Maulvi Abdul Hai (died 1828)—became disciples of Syed Ahmad, an event that raised his mystic confidence. This endorsement only added to his reputation, and his popularity grew with adherents flocking to him by the thousands.

Reform movement
Syed Ahmad was the first major Islamic theologian on the subcontinent to realize the necessity of an Islamic movement that was simultaneously scholarly, military, and political to repel the British threat. He eagerly addressed the Muslim masses directly, not traditional leaders, in his call for a popular jihad against a Sikh rule in Punjab. His evangelism—based on networks of preachers, collectors, and judges—also addressed the common people and not the rulers' courts.

At the core of the reform movement initiated by Syed Ahmad was the advocacy of a puritanical interpretation of Tawhid (monotheism), similar to the Muwahhidun movement in Arabia. The movement fought against local practices and customs related to saint veneration and grave visits, which they regarded as bid'ah (religious innovations) and shirk (polytheism) that corrupted Islam. Syed Ahmad's reformist teachings were set down in two prominent treatises: Sirat'ul Mustaqim (The Straight Path) and Taqwiyatul-Iman (Strengthening of the Faith), compiled by his acolyte Shah Muhammad Ismail. The two works stressed the centrality of Tawhid (monotheism), advocated that acts of worship—such as dua and sacrifices—belonged solely to God, and denounced all those practices and beliefs that were held in any way to compromise Tawhid. The followers of Syed Ahmad viewed three sources of threat to their beliefs: traditional Sufism, Shiism, and popular custom.

Syed Ahmad urged Muslims to follow the path laid down by Prophet Muhammad (Tariqa -i Muhammadiyah), abandon all superstitious activities in various Sufi orders, and called for a total reformation of Tasawwuf. Syed Ahmad reserved his sharpest condemnations for the moral degradation of Muslims and blamed the corrupt Sufis as the primary cause of Muslim decline. He called upon Muslims to strictly abide by the tenets of the Shariah (Islamic law) by following the Qur'an and the Sunnah. The most prominent feature of Syed Ahmad's teachings was his warning to avoid shirk (polytheism), bid'ah (religious innovations); and re-assertion of Tawhid. Once he said to a group of his disciples: Brethren! the purpose of performing the bay'ah is that you should give up everything you do which is of the nature of polytheism or heresy, your making of ta'ziyahs, setting up banners, worshipping the tombs of Pirs and martyrs, making offerings to them and taking vows in their names. All this you should give up, and do not believe that your good and ill come from anyone except God; do not recognize anyone but Him as having the power to grant the fulfillment of your wishes. If you continue [in this way of polytheism and heresy], merely offering bay'ah will bring no benefit.

Syed Ahmad visited numerous towns of the North Indian plains between 1818 to 1821. He incited hundreds of missionaries to preach against Shia beliefs and practices. Syed Ahmad repeatedly destroyed tazias, an act that resulted in subsequent riots and chaos. Syed Ahmad called upon the Muslim masses to abandon practices related to Shia influence, such as the tazias which were replicas of the tombs of the martyrs of Karbala taken in procession during the mourning ceremony of Muharram. Shah Muhammad Ismail declared the act of breaking tazias as an obligation upon all believers and asserted that it was as virtuous as breaking idols. Syed Ahmad is reported to have organized the burning of thousands of tazias.

In 1821, Syed Ahmad left for Hajj along with a group of devotees. He returned from Hajj in 1823, and once again visited different parts of India. For Syed Ahmad and the followers of the Faraizi movement, India was "Dar al-Harb" (a land without a peace treaty with Muslims) and therefore jihad was obligatory for all Muslims. In his book Sirat-e-Mustaqeem, Shah Ismail Dehlvi wrote:A large part of present-day India has become “Dar-ul-Harab”. Compare the situation with the heavenly blessings of India two and three hundred years ago.Syed Ahmad's opponents labeled him a Wahhabi (a follower of the puritan Sunni reform movement in Arabia), but he did not consider himself as such.

Jihad movement and Islamic State 

Upon return, Syed Ahmad regarded his immediate enemy to be the Sikh Empire ruled by Ranjit Singh, which was expanding, close to Afghanistan. Syed Ahmad intended to establish a strong Islamic state on the North-West Frontier region in the Peshawar valley, as a strategic base for the future invasion of India. When the military action began, some Muslim Nawabs (like his former employer Amir Khan) provided funds but did not join Syed Ahmad for jihad. Around 8,000 mujahideen (holy warriors) accompanied him, mostly consisting of clergymen and poor people. The rulers of Tonk, Gwalior, and Rampur supported Syed Ahmad with British consent because they were dependent on British forces and knew the British would not stop them from aiding an enemy of a nation they would soon be at war with.

Arriving in Peshawar valley in late 1826, Syed Ahmad and his followers made their base in towns of Hund and Zaida in Swabi District. Syed Ahmad called upon the local Pashtun tribes to wage jihad, and demanded that they renounce their tribal customs and adopt the Sharia. The traditional khans were replaced by Wahhabi-style reformist ulama (Islamic scholars) and a system of Islamic taxes was established to finance the jihad. Soon after this evangelist campaign and the establishment of the Sharia system, jihad was declared. He sent an ultimatum to Ranjit Singh, demanding:[...] either become a Muslim, pay Jizyah or fight and remember that in case of war, Yaghistan supports the Indians.

The mujahideen were educated with both theological doctrines and physical training sessions. Syed Ahmad organized wrestling, archery training, and shooting competitions. The mujahideen also chanted several Islamic anthems. One such popular anthem to have survived, known as "Risala Jihad", goes:
 
War against the Infidel is incumbent on all Musalmans;
 
make provisions for all things.
 
He who from his heart gives one farthing to the cause,
 
shall hereafter receive seven hundredfold from God.
 
He who shall equip a warrior in this cause of God,
 
shall hereafter obtain a martyr's reward;
 
His children dread not the trouble of the grave,
 
nor the last trump, not the Day of Judgement.
 
Cease to be crowded; join the divine leader, and smite the Infidel.
 
I give thanks to God that a great leader has been born,
 
in the thirteenth of the Hijra.In December 1826, Syed Ahmad and his followers clashed with Sikh troops at Akora with some success. On 11 January 1827, allegiance was sworn on his hand and he was declared Caliph and Imam. Syed Ahmad's claim to Khilafah was viewed with suspicion in the Frontier region as well as in the clerical circles of North India. When the Jumu'ah (Friday prayer) sermon was read in his name, symbolising his claim to power, the tribal chiefs became wary. According to prominent Pathan Sardars like Khadi Khan, Maulvis were ill-equipped to run the affairs of a state. In response to the criticisms, Syed Ahmad asserted that his aim was not material but to lead a jihad against kuffar. Defending his claim to Caliphate, Syed Ahmad writes:We thank and praise God, the real master and the true king, who bestowed upon his humble, recluse and helpless servant the title of Caliphate, first through occult gestures and revelations, in which there is no room for doubt, and then by guiding the hearts of the believers towards me. This way God appointed me as the Imam (leader)... the person who sincerely confesses to my position is special in the eyes of God, and the one who denies it is, of course sinful. My opponents who deny me of this position will be humiliated and disgraced.

Apart from the rebellious Pashtun chieftains, Syed Ahmad also faced strong opposition from Sufi clerical establishment. Throughout their armed activities during the 1820s and 1830s, mujahideen engaged in ideological and physical conflict with the Naqshbandi-Mujaddidis and various Sufi orders such as Qadiris and Chishtis. Excommunicating the opponents of the jihad movement as apostates and obliging all Muslims to fight them, Shah Ismail Dehlvi, the faithful commander of Syed Ahmad wrote:[...] therefore, obedience to Syed Ahmad is obligatory on all Muslims. Whoever does not accept the leadership of His Excellency or rejects it after accepting it, is an apostate and mischievous, and killing him is part of the jihad as is the killing of the disbelievers. Therefore, the appropriate response to opponents is that of the sword and not the pen.
 
After the conquest of Peshawar by the mujahideen, Syed Ahmad announced the abolition of all tribal rituals that he regarded as bid'ah (religious innovations). He abolished various practices such as: the bride being paid a regular price for marriage; the widowed of the deceased Muslims being divided among his heirs; practice of more than four marriages; denial of inheritance to women; clan wars being considered like jihad and its plunder being considered as booty. He also pushed for aggressive and violent policies to enforce Sharia. These included: allowing brides as long as half of the agreed money was given; young girls eligible for marriage should be married immediately; flogging people who didn't pray.
 
In addition to his Islamic social agenda, Syed Ahmad also attempted to collect ushr (an Islamic tithe), amounting to 10% of crop yields. This policy was faced with fierce opposition from an alliance of local Pathan tribesmen, who briefly managed to occupy Peshawar. The alliance was defeated and the Islamic reformers finally re-captured Peshawar. Over several months during 1830, Sayyed Ahmad tried to reconcile between established power hierarchies. But before the end of 1830, another organized uprising occurred, and Syed Ahmad's soldiers in Peshawar and surrounding villages were murdered and the movement was forced to retreat to the hills. There, in the town of Balakot in 1831, Syed Ahmad was killed and beheaded by the Sikh Army.

Battle of Balakot

 
 Syed Ahmad's political and religious power created strong opposition against him in the Frontier region and the locals started to revolt. The decisive moments for Syed Ahmad came in 1830. The Pukhtuns rose against him and around two hundred mujahideen were killed in the Peshawar valley, which compelled him to migrate and try his luck in Kashmir, his long-cherished dream.
 
On 6 May 1831, on the day of Jumu'ah 23 Zulqa'da 1246 AH, Syed Ahmad Barelvi's mujahideen forces prepared for the final battle at Balakot Maidan in the mountainous valley of Mansehra district. An ill-equipped army of 10,000 mujahideen faced a 12,000 strong force of banduqchis led by the Sikh commander Sher Singh. On that day, Syed Ahmed, Shah Ismail, and prominent leaders of the Wahhabi movement fell fighting in the battlefield. Of the 10,000 mujahideen, 9,000 died; Sikh casualties were 5,000 deaths. Sikh victory at Balakot arose jubilation in Lahore. The British government also congratulated Ranjit Singh in his victory. The defeat at Balakot was a devastating blow to the Wahhabi movement.
 
After Sher Singh left the area, Sikh soldiers dug up the grave of Syed Ahmad Barelvi and threw his dead body into the Kunhar River. It was never found as the river flows too fast in that area.

Legacy 
Syed Ahmad is widely regarded as the founder of the subcontinental Ahl-i Hadith movement and his teachings are highly influential amongst its members. Another major group that carries his legacy is the Deobandi school of thought. Scholar Edward Mortimer believes Syed Ahmad anticipated modern Islamists in waging jihad and attempting to create an Islamic state with strict enforcement of Sharia. Scholar Olivier Roy considers Syed Ahmad to be the first modern Islamic leader to lead a movement that was "religious, military and political" and to address the common people and rulers with a call for jihad. The mujahideen were unprecedented for their tactics of popular mobilization aimed at swiftly achieving the objectives of social reformation through military means, combined with fierce hostility towards non-Muslim powers such as the British Empire and the Sikhs. Syed Ahmad was committed to expand his emirate to the whole of South Asia and authored tracts calling upon Indian Muslims to join the cause of jihad.

Syed Ahmad attained the exemplar status of shahid (martyr), one of the highest honours in Islam, and would inspire generations of Militant Islamist ideologues and Jihadi activists throughout the 19th, 20th, and 21st centuries. His calls to action—such as a return to the pristine Islam of the Salaf, and the purifying of Islamic culture from Western and Shi'i influences through armed jihad—became major hallmarks of South Asian and Central Asian militant Islamist movements like the Taliban. Al-Qaeda's ideology was greatly inspired by Syed Ahmad's jihad movement, which was waged from Eastern Afghanistan and Khyber Pakhtunkwa. Influenced by Syed Ahmad, contemporary Jihadists compare American hegemony to the 19th century British rule to justify their campaigns.

The jihad movement of Syed Ahmad made a great impact on Islamic scholarly tradition of South Asia and would deeply divide many clerics and theologians. Some intellectuals and scholars criticised the militant aspects of his reform programme, especially its sectarian violence against other self-professed Muslims whom the mujahideen declared as heretics or apostates. Scholars like Wahiduddin Khan asserted that Syed Ahmad's jihad was illegitimate, since it was self-declared and not waged by a Muslim ruler. Meanwhile, South Asian Islamists eagerly embraced Syed Ahmad's teachings and popularised his writings that sought the militant restoration of an Islamic state. All major organisations that wage militant jihad in Pakistan, Afghanistan, and Kashmir use the rhetoric and legacy of Syed Ahmad's mujahideen to shore up support from the conservative base. Hafiz Saeed's Lashkar-e-Taiba and Masood Azhar's Jaish-e-Muhammad are two major militant Islamist organisations inspired by Syed Ahmad that wage jihad against India in Kashmir. Other organisations include Harkat-ul-Mujahideen, a Jihadist group in Pakistan.

References

Bibliography

External links

Syed Ahmed Barelvi and his Jihad movement

1786 births
1831 deaths
Proto-Salafists
Islamic fundamentalism
Indian Muslim scholars of Islam
Muslim nationalism in South Asia
18th-century Muslim scholars of Islam
Muslim reformers
Critics of Shia Islam
Anti-Shi'ism
Indian Islamists
People from Raebareli
18th-century Indian Muslims
19th-century Indian Muslims
19th-century Muslim scholars of Islam
Syed Ahmad Barelvi
Ahl-i Hadith people